Johann Philipp Gustav von Ewers or Evers (27 July 1779 – 20 November 1830) was a German legal historian and the founder of Russian legal history as a scholarly discipline.

Ewers was a farmer’s son from the village of Amelunxen (now a part of Beverungen) in the Bishopric of Paderborn. He first studied theology and then political science at the University of Göttingen.

His first employment, as was customary for a graduate from a poor background, was as a private tutor. This brought him to the Imperial Russian province of Livonia, where he was to remain for the rest of his life. While teaching, he pursued his scholarly interests, especially regarding Russian political and legal history, which became one of his main fields of study – one indeed of which he is often regarded the founder.

Influenced by the Hegelian definition of society and state, he described the traditional tribal structure of Russia as the foundation of Russian statehood, most notably in this 1826 monograph Das älteste Recht der Russen. Evers' ideas have found a continued reception among Russian legal theorists.

On the basis of his publications, he was offered in 1810 the Chair of History, Statistics, and Geography of the Russian State at the University of Dorpat (now Tartu) in what is today Estonia. He occupied that chair until 1826, when he transferred to the Law Faculty. In 1816, Ewers declined an offer of the Chair of Political Economy at the newly founded University of Berlin. In the same year, he had become Prorector of the University of Dorpat and in 1818, Rector, to which office he was re-elected every year until his death at Dorpat in 1830, aged 51.

Selected works

Provisorische Verfassung des Bauernstandes in Estland. 1805, 1806.
Vom Ursprung des Russischen Staats. 1808
Unangenehme Erinnerungen an August Ludwig Schlözer. 1810.
Kritische Vorarbeiten zur Geschichte der Russen, 2 vols., 1814.
Geschichte der Russen, vol. 1. 1816.
Das älteste Recht der Russen in seiner geschichtlichen Entwicklung. 1826.
Rhapsodische Gedanken über die wissenschaftliche Bedeutung des Naturrechts. 1828.

Further reading
 Djakonov, M.A. (1903). "Johann Philipp Gustav v. Ewers." In G.V. Levitski, ed. Biografitsheskii Slovar professorov i prepodavatelei imperatorskavo Juerjevskago, byvshago Derptskago Univesriteta sa sto let ego sushestvovania (1802–1902), vol. 2. Jurjev: Mattisen, 510-537.
 Drechsler, Wolfgang (1998). On the Eminence of the Social Sciences at the University of Dorpat. Aula Lectures. Tartu: at the University Press. (Includes the only biosketch in English.)
 Leppik, Lea (2001). Rektor Ewers. Tartu: Eesti Ajalooarhiiv.
 Schevcov, Vladimir (1976). Die Sippentheorie bei Gustav Ewers. Berlin.
 Stupperich, Robert (1975). Gustav Ewers. Paderborn: Westfälische Lebensbilder.
 Peeter Järvelaid. Põhikooli õpetaja Gustav Ewers Väimelast. – Eesti Elu (Toronto),  18 January 2008.
 Peeter Järvelaid. Õpetaja Gustav Ewers Väimelast. – Võrumaa Teataja, 12 January 2008.

References

External links

Ostdeutsche Biographie 
EEVA (Biography, Full texts, Image, Bibliography)

1781 births
1830 deaths
People from Höxter (district)
Baltic-German people
19th-century German historians
Jurists from North Rhine-Westphalia
Russian lawyers
Estonian scholars
University of Göttingen alumni
Academic staff of the University of Tartu
Legal historians
Rectors of the University of Tartu
Corresponding members of the Saint Petersburg Academy of Sciences
Honorary members of the Saint Petersburg Academy of Sciences
German male non-fiction writers